The women's team foil was one of eight fencing events on the fencing at the 1984 Summer Olympics programme. It was the seventh appearance of the event. The competition was held from 5 to 6 August 1984. 48 fencers from 10 nations competed.

Rosters

Results

Round 1

Round 1 Pool A 

The United States and France each defeated Great Britain, 9–7 and 9–3, respectively. The two victors then faced off. France won 9–2.

Round 1 Pool B 

Romania and China each defeated Canada, 9–0 and 9–3, respectively. The two victors then faced off. Romania won 9–4.

Round 1 Pool C 

In the first set of matches, West Germany beat Argentina 9–1 and Italy defeated Japan 9–3. The second set saw the winners both win again (securing advancement) and the loser both lose again (resulting in elimination), as West Germany prevailed over Japan 9–4 and Italy won against Argentina 9–0. Finally, West Germany took the top spot in the group by beating Italy 9–4 while Argentina finished last after losing to Japan 9–1.

Elimination rounds

References

Foil team
1984 in women's fencing
Fen